Ryszard Piotr Jurkowski (born 28 May 1945) is a Polish architect and urban planner noted for his contemporary and embracing minimalism design of residential, commercial, educational, industrial and civic buildings, and for his fight against the monotonous and dreary architecture of the communist era. He is one of Poland’s most prolific architects.

Early life and career 
Ryszard Jurkowski was born in Sosnowiec in 1945, where he also went to Boleslaw Prus Secondary School. In 1969 he graduated with a master's degree in architecture from Krakow University of Technology, subsequently obtaining the professional qualifications to practice under the title ‘architect’.

In 1969 he joined the Regional Municipal Building Company in Sosnowiec, but two years later began working for a large architectural firm Investprojekt in Katowice. Since 1990 he has been a senior partner at AiR Jurkowscy Architekci, a practice he had established with his wife who also holds a degree in architecture.

Between 1991 and 1996 Jurkowski was a senior lecturer at Krakow University of Technology and in the years 1992-1998 and 2003-2006 the chairman of the Regional Commission for Urban Planning and Architecture in Katowice He was also appointed a member of Poland’s General Commission for Urban Planning and Architecture in Warsaw and he played a significant role in creating the Act of 15 December 2000 on professional self-governing bodies for architects.

He was the chief coordinator of the professional architects' environments and in 2000 was elected the president of the Association of Polish Architects, and held this position until 2006.

Jurkowski is a sponsor and promoter of publishing architectural and design books and, in 2018 orchestrated the publishing of the first Polish edition of On Adam’s House in Paradise: The Idea of the Primitive Hut in Architectural History (Polish: O rajskim domu Adama: Idea pierwotnej chaty w historii architektury), a literary work on the history and philosophy of architecture written by the foremost historian and critic Professor Joseph Rykwert, and published under the patronage of the National Institute of Architecture and Urban Planning (NIAIU) and the Ministry of Culture and National Heritage.

He is also a member of the Polish Architecture Council. and one of the judges of the Collegium of Competition Judges SARP.

Honours and awards 
Ryszard Jurkowski is the winner of SARP Honorary Award 1999, SARP Award of the Year 1987 and 2010 and of the 1st and 2nd degree Award of the Ministry of Construction (now the Ministry of Infrastructure).

He is the recipient of the Honoris Gratia  2011 and of the Silver and Gold Cross of Merit in the recognition of his achievements. In 2013 he was nominated for the European Union Prize for Contemporary Architecture / Mies van der Rohe Award for the Home Army Museum in Krakow. He is also the winner of Brick Award Polska 2013.

In 2012 he has received the Officer's Cross of the Order of Polonia Restituta from the President of Poland for his outstanding contribution to Polish architecture.

Selected projects

Photo gallery

References

External links 
Brick Award 
Budimex 
Honoris Gratia 

1945 births
Living people
People from Katowice
Polish urban planners
20th-century Polish architects
21st-century Polish architects
Recipients of the Cross of Merit (Poland)
Recipients of the Order of Polonia Restituta
Tadeusz Kościuszko University of Technology alumni